Aliskerovo is an inhabited locality (an urban-type settlement) in Bilibinsky District of Chukotka Autonomous Okrug, Russia.  Population: 1, a reduction from 7 (2002 Census);

Geography
Keperveyem is located just southeast of Bilibino, west of the Ilirney Range and east of Keperveyem and the Kyrganay Range. The Chuvanay Range rises to the west and southwest of the town, on the other side of the Maly Anyuy River.

History
The settlement was founded in 1961 and named after Soviet geologist , who played a significant role in the discovery and mapping of natural resources in this part of Russia.

By 1968, the settlement had a population of around 2,300 inhabitants. The mines were declared unprofitable and that there was no possibility of developing any other form of economy in 1999 and the settlement was closed along with a number of others in Chukotka. The Russian government guaranteed funds to transport non-working pensioners and the unemployed in liquidated settlements including Aliskerovo from Chukotka to other parts of Russia. The Ministry of railways was obliged to lease containers for the transportation of the migrants' goods to the Chukotkan administration and ensure that they were delivered to the various settlements. By 1998, however, it was mostly depopulated.  As of 2009, Aliskerovo is included in the list of settlements currently in the process of being liquidated.

Meteorite discovery
A meteorite was recovered here on July 10, 1977. The meteorite was discovered in alluvium approximately 200,000 years old. Some of its structural features testify to repeated metamorphic influences (impact loads and heating), which occurred during both its extraterrestrial existence and its passage through the atmosphere and fall to Earth including: exhibiting striated kamacite, emulsion-like taenite, and the recrystallization of troilite-daubréelite nodules.

Demographics
The 2002 census data showed the population to consist of five males and two females, though the population had fallen to just 5 by 2005 according to an environmental impact study on the Kupol Gold Project. The population had fallen to just a single person by 2010 according to the official Bilibino District website.

Transport
Aliskerovo is not connected to any other inhabited location by permanent road however, there is a small network of roads within the settlement including:

 Улица 70 лет Октября (Ulitsa 70 let Oktyabrya, lit. 70 Years of October Street)
 Улица Геологов (Ulitsa Geologov, lit. Geologists Street)
 Улица Горняцкая (Ulitsa Gornyatskaya)
 Улица Егорова (Ulitsa Yegorova)
 Улица Полевая (Ulitsa Polevaya, lit. Field Street)
 Улица Проточная (Ulitsa Protochnaya, lit. Flow Street)
 Улица Центральная (Ulitsa Tsentralnaya, lit. Central Street)
 Улица Школьная (Ulitsa Shkolnaya, lit. School Street)

Climate
Aliserkovo has a Continental Subarctic climate (Dfc). The climate around the settlement is bitterly cold for most of the year, with temperatures below freezing from the end of September and remaining so until the following May. July is the warmest month, with an average daily temperature of 12.6 °C. January is the coldest month, with a mean daily temperature of −48.2 °C.

See also
List of inhabited localities in Bilibinsky District

References

Notes

Sources

Urban-type settlements in Chukotka Autonomous Okrug
Ghost towns in Chukotka Autonomous Okrug
Populated places established in 1961
1961 establishments in the Soviet Union